Chhota Udaipur railway station is a small railway station in Chhota Udaipur district, Gujarat. Its code is CTD and it serves Chhota Udaipur town. The station lacks running water and sanitation and its two platforms are not well sheltered.

History 
In 2014, the Prime Minister's office gave clearance for the line and the report was forwarded to the Ministry of Railway for a proposed broad-gauge railway line from Chhota Udaipur to Ratlam via Alirajpur, Khargone, Barwani through to Dhar. This railway line connected Dhar to the railway system for the first time after being demanded for a decade by the residents of Nimar region, as well as Eastern Gujarat. It is to span 157-km, to be built at a cost Rs 1,286 crore.

Trains 
 59117/18/19 Pratapnagar–Chhota Udaipur Passenger
 59121/22 Pratapnagar–Alirajpur Passenger
 79455/56 Vadodara–Chhota Udaipur DEMU

See also
 Vadodara Junction railway station
 Pratapnagar railway station
 Bodeli railway station
 Alirajpur railway station

References

Railway stations in Vadodara district
Railway stations in Chhota Udaipur district
Vadodara railway division